The 31st running of the Tour of Flanders cycling classic was held on Sunday, 27 April 1947. Belgian Emiel Faignaert won the race in a tree-man sprint in Wetteren. 55 of 213 riders finished.

Route
The race started in Ghent and finished in Wetteren – totaling 257 km. The course featured three categorized climbs:

Results

References

Tour of Flanders
1947 in road cycling
1947 in Belgian sport